I5, I-5 or I 5 may refer to:

Computing
 Intel Core i5, a brand of microprocessors
 i5, an IBM AS/400 line of minicomputers
 i5/OS, previous name of the IBM i operating system

Military
 , a 1931 Junsen type submarine
 Polikarpov I-5, a Soviet fighter biplane of the 1930s
 I 5, a Swedish regimental designation (5th Infantry Regiment) that has been used by the following units:
 2nd Life Grenadier Regiment (1816–1927)
 Jämtland Ranger Regiment (1928–1974, 1990–1994, 2000–2004)

Transportation
 Interstate 5 (I-5), a US highway
 Inline-five engine, or straight-five engine
 AirAsia India (IATA code)
 General Electric I-5, the "industrial" model of GE's Elec-Trak electric tractor

Other uses
 I5 (girl group), American band in 2000-2001
 Inferior Five, fictional superhero group from DC Comics

See also
 iPhone 5, an Apple smartphone